The list of aircraft of World War II includes all the aircraft used by those countries which were at war during World War II from the period between their joining the conflict and the conflict ending for them. Aircraft developed but not used operationally in the war are in the prototypes section at the end. Prototypes for aircraft that entered service under a different design number are ignored in favour of the service version. The date the aircraft entered serviceor was first flown if the service date is unknown or it did not enter servicefollows the name, followed by the country of origin and major wartime users. Aircraft used for multiple roles are generally only listed under their primary role unless specialized versions were built for other roles in significant numbers. Aircraft used by neutral countries such as Spain, Switzerland and Sweden (or countries which did no significant fighting such as most of those in South America) are not included.

Fighter aircraft

Biplane fighters

Single-engined, single-seat monoplane fighters and fighter bombers

Heavy fighters (multi-engined or multi-seat) and night fighters

Jet- and rocket- propelled fighters

Bomber and attack aircraft

Medium and heavy bombers, and maritime patrol

Light bombers, tactical reconnaissance and observation aircraft

Carrier-based naval bombers

Strategic and photo-reconnaissance aircraft 
Strategic and photo-reconnaissance aircraft were frequently specially modified variants of high performance aircraft, usually fighters or bombers.

Seaplanes

Flying boats

Floatplanes

Transport aircraft

Trainers 
Primary trainers are used for basic flight training while advanced trainers were used for familiarization with the more complex systems and higher speeds of combat aircraft, and for air combat training. Multi-engined trainers were used to prepare pilots for multi-engine bombers and transports, and to train navigators, bombardiers, gunners and flight engineers. Most nations used obsolete combat types for advanced training, although large scale training programs such as the British Commonwealth Air Training Plan (BCATP) required more aircraft than were available and aircraft were designed and built specifically to fulfill training roles. Intermediate trainers were used in several countries but additional hours at the primary stage made them redundant.

Glider trainers

Primary trainers

Advanced trainers

Bomber trainers, target tugs and misc. trainers

Rotorcraft

Lighter than air

Rockets and drones

Prototypes
Prototypes were aircraft that were intended to enter service but did not, either due to changing requirements, failing to meet requirements, other problems, or the end of the war. If the aircraft was deployed to regular squadrons or used in an operational capacity other than evaluation, it should be listed above under its appropriate type. Napkinwaffe - paper projects and aircraft that first flew after the war are not included.

Fighter prototypes

Bomber and attack aircraft prototypes

Transport prototypes

Glider prototypes

Trainer prototypes

Rotorcraft prototypes

Missile prototypes

Miscellaneous prototypes

Experimental aircraft
Aircraft intended to prove a concept or idea and which were not intended or suitable for military service.
Does not include operational aircraft modified for experimental purposes.

Flight behaviour research

Engine research

Misc research

See also

List of Interwar military aircraft

List of fighter aircraft
List of bomber aircraft
List of attack aircraft
List of jet aircraft of World War II
List of World War II military gliders

List of aircraft of Canada's air forces
List of aircraft of the French Air Force during World War II
List of aircraft of Germany in World War II
List of aircraft of Japan, World War II
List of aircraft of Poland during World War II
List of aircraft of the Red Army Air Forces
List of Regia Aeronautica aircraft used in World War II
List of aircraft of the United Kingdom in World War II
List of aircraft of the United States during World War II

References

Notes

Citations

Bibliography

 Lists of World War II aircraft